Andrew Booker may refer to:

 Andrew Booker (mathematician) (born 1976), British mathematician specializing in number theory
 Andrew Booker (musician), British drummer and vocalist